is a former Japanese pop singer. She is a former ninth-generation member of the Japanese girl group Morning Musume.

Early life
Suzuki Kanon was born on August 5, 1998, in the Mikawa Province area in Aichi, Japan.

Career
On January 2, at the first Hello! Project 2011 Winter ~Kangei Shinsen Matsuri~ A gana Live concert, Tsunku announced Suzuki as one of the new members of Morning Musume's 9th generation alongside Ikuta Erina, Sayashi Riho, and Hello Pro Kenshuusei member Fukumura Mizuki. That same day, Suzuki made her concert debut. In April, Suzuki debuted in the Morning Musume single "Maji Desu ka Ska!". Suzuki starred in a stage play titled Reborn ~Inochi no Audition~ along with Niigaki Risa, Tanaka Reina, the other 9th Generation members, and Kudo Haruka in 2011. On April 18, 2012, it was announced that Tanaka Reina and Morning Musume's 9th & 10th Generation members would star in a new stage play titled Stacey's Shoujo Saisatsu Kageki. The musical ran from June 6–12. On May 13, information was released about an event for the 9th and 10th generation members of Morning Musume as well as S/mileage's 2nd generation members, titled Mosuma FC Event ~Gachi☆Kira~, that was set to take place on June 15, 18 and 20 at Yokohama Blitz. In 2014, Suzuki began appearing solo in various variety TV/game shows: she appeared on Quiz 30 ~Sanketsu Seyo~ on April 27 (alongside Tsugunaga Momoko) and May 18 (alongside Michishige Sayumi and Ikuta Erina), VS. Arashi on July 3 as a part of Team Pocchari (Team Chubby), Tsutaete Pikacchi on September 6 and DownTown (with Sayashi Riho) in September. On August 5, Suzuki had her 16th birthday event, titled Morning Musume '14 ~Suzuki Kanon Birthday Event 2014~. The event featured one performance at Yamano Hall in Tokyo, Japan. On October 27, during Kon'ya mo Usa-chan Peace, it was announced that Suzuki will have her own radio show, later titled Itsudemo! Kannon Smile, on CBC Radio starting on December 2, replacing Michishige Sayumi's radio show. On February 7, 2016, Suzuki announced she would be graduating from Morning Musume '16 at the end of May, and retire showbiz.

Hello! Project groups and units
 Morning Musume (2011–2016)
 Hello! Project Mobekimasu (2011)

Discography

Singles
 Morning Musume
 "Maji Desu ka Ska!"
 "Only You"
 "Kono Chikyū no Heiwa o Honki de Negatterun Da yo! / Kare to Issho ni Omise ga Shitai!"
 "Pyoco Pyoco Ultra"
 "Ren'ai Hunter"
 "One Two Three / The Matenrō Show"
 "Wakuteka Take a Chance"
 "Help Me!!"
 "Brainstorming / Kimi Sae Ireba Nani mo Iranai"
 "Wagamama Ki no Mama Ai no Joke / Ai no Gundan"
 "Egao no Kimi wa Taiyō sa / Kimi no Kawari wa Iyashinai / What is Love?" 
 "Toki o Koe Sora o Koe / Password is 0"
 "Tiki Bun / Shabadaba Dū / Mikaeri Bijin"
 "Seishun Kozo ga Naiteiru / Yūgure wa Ameagari / Ima Koko Kara"
 "Oh My Wish! / Sukatto My Heart / Ima Sugu Tobikomu Yūki"
 "Tsumetai Kaze to Kataomoi / Endless Sky / One and Only"
 "Utakata Saturday Night! / The Vision / Tokyo to Iu Katasumi"
 Hello! Project Mobekimasu
 "Busu ni Naranai Tetsugaku" ブスにならない哲学 (November 16, 2011)

Filmography

Solo DVDs

TV dramas
 Sūgaku Joshi Gakuen ( — )

Musicals
  (October 8–17, 2011, Yoyogi, Shibuya, Tokyo)
  (2012)
  (2012)

TV shows
  (2011)
  (September 2011 – 2012)

Internet shows
 (April 2011–present)

Events
 Hello! Channel Vol. 5 handshake event to celebrate the release of the magazine-book series (August 19, 2011)

References

External links
 Morning Musume official YouTube channel

1998 births
Japanese women pop singers
Living people
Morning Musume members
Japanese female idols
Musicians from Aichi Prefecture